Arirang 3 (아리랑 3편, Arirang sam-pyeon) is a 1936 Korean film directed by and starring Na Woon-gyu. The second sequel of Na's ground-breaking 1926 film, Arirang, this was the only entry in the series that was not silent. It premiered at the DanSungSa Theater in downtown Seoul.

Plot
This third and last installment in the story of the mentally ill student, Choi Yeong-jin, begins with him being released from prison. He attempts to live a peaceful existence until he witnesses the rape of his sister, at which point his mental problems return.

See also
 Korea under Japanese rule
 List of Korean-language films
 Cinema of Korea

References

External links
 

1936 films
Pre-1948 Korean films
Korean black-and-white films
Films directed by Na Woon-gyu